Wyciągając Rękę Po... Dobry Ynteres is the first album of Polish punk rock band WC. The album was released only as an MC.

Track listing

A side
 Bodziu Wyłącz Tamten Wzmacniacz (part I)
 Walka O Przetrwanie
 Masturbacja
 Szczęście
 Agresja
 Jestem Tank
 Al-Afrat
 Nie Chcę Za Was Umierać

B side
 Bez Sensu
 Nowo-Nowe...
 Stagnacja?
 Ja
 Ballada O Twoim Ryju
 Blitzkrieg
 Łazienka
 Bodziu Wyłącz Tamten Wzmacniacz (part II)

Resource
Band's official site URL accessed at 23 August 2006

1994 albums
WC (band) albums